John Bennett Sousa (born April 6, 1995) is an American professional baseball pitcher for the Cincinnati Reds of Major League Baseball (MLB). He previously played in MLB for the Chicago White Sox.

Professional career
Sousa attended The Benjamin School in Palm Beach Gardens, Florida and played college baseball at the University of Virginia. In 2015, he played collegiate summer baseball with the Orleans Firebirds of the Cape Cod Baseball League. He was drafted by the Washington Nationals in the 34th round of the 2017 Major League Baseball Draft, but did not sign and returned to Virginia.

Chicago White Sox
He was then drafted by the Chicago White Sox in the 10th round of the 2018 MLB Draft. In 20 games, Sousa posted a record of 2-0 and an ERA of 1.27. In 2019, Sousa posted an ERA of 2.49 in 43 games with Kannapolis, Winston-Salem, and Birmingham. Sousa was added to the Glendale Desert Dogs roster for 2019 where he posted a 5.59 ERA in 9 games. Sousa did not play in a game in 2020 due to the cancellation of the minor league season because of the COVID-19 pandemic. In 2021, Sousa posted a 3.61 ERA in 41 games while striking out 71 batters in 47.1 innings.

The White Sox added Sousa to their 40-man roster after the 2021 season. He was named to the Opening Day roster for the 2022 season. Sousa made his MLB debut on April 8, 2022, pitching a scoreless inning out of the bullpen. Despite having a 3–0 record, after appearing in 25 games and having an ERA of 8.41, Sousa was sent back to Triple-A on June 14.

On February 20, 2023, Sousa was designated for assignment after the signing of Elvis Andrus was made official.

Cincinnati Reds
On February 22, 2023, Sousa was claimed off waivers by the Cincinnati Reds.

References

External links

1995 births
Living people
People from North Palm Beach, Florida
Baseball players from Florida
Major League Baseball pitchers
Chicago White Sox players
Virginia Cavaliers baseball players
Orleans Firebirds players
Great Falls Voyagers players
Kannapolis Intimidators players
Winston-Salem Dash players
Glendale Desert Dogs players
Birmingham Barons players
Charlotte Knights players